Ivan Kryvosheyenko (born 11 May 1984) is a professional Ukrainian football striker who last played for FC Vorskla Poltava in the Ukrainian Premier League.

External links

Profile on Official Illychivets Website
Profile on Football Squads

1984 births
Living people
Ukrainian footballers
FC Mariupol players
FC Metalurh Donetsk players
FC Vorskla Poltava players
Ukrainian Premier League players
Ukrainian First League players
Ukrainian Second League players
Ukraine under-21 international footballers
Association football forwards
People from Pryluky
Sportspeople from Chernihiv Oblast
21st-century Ukrainian people